Dov Baer ben Shraga Philippsthal was a German Jewish author, who lived in Berlin at the beginning of the nineteenth century. He wrote Naḥale Devash (Berlin, 1832), which contains extracts from various Hebrew books dealing mainly with philosophical and ethical subjects.

Publications

References
 

Year of birth unknown
Year of death missing
19th-century German Jews
19th-century German male writers
Writers from Berlin